Patham Pasali is a 1970 Tamil-language comedy drama film written and directed by K. Balachander. It is a remake of his own 1969 Telugu film Sattekalapu Satteya. The film stars Gemini Ganesan, Nagesh and Rajasree.

Cast 
Male cast
 Gemini Ganesan
 Nagesh
 S. A. Ashokan

Female cast
 Rajasree
 Manimala
 Vijaya Lalitha
 Sachu
 Jayakumari
 C. Vasantha

Production 
Patham Pasali was directed by K. Balachander, and a remake of his own Telugu film Sattekalapu Satteya (1969). It was produced by Alangudi Somu under Alangudi Movies. Cinematography was handled by Nemai Ghosh, and editing by N. R. Kittu.

Soundtrack 
The soundtrack was composed by V. Kumar, while the lyrics were written by Alangudi Somu.

Release and reception 
Patham Pasali was released on 11 April 1970, and failed commercially.

References

External links 
 

1970 comedy-drama films
1970 films
1970s Tamil-language films
Films directed by K. Balachander
Films scored by V. Kumar
Indian comedy-drama films
Tamil remakes of Telugu films